The 2013 Boodles Challenge was an exhibition tennis tournament held before Wimbledon to serve as a warm-up to players. Taking place from 18 to 22 June 2013 at Stoke Park in Buckinghamshire, it was the 12th edition of the Boodles Challenge. Viktor Troicki won the title, defeating Robin Haase 7-5, 6-4 in a thrilling encounter. Novak Djokovic and Grigor Dimitrov delighted the crowd with a strip-tease during their exhibition match on the third day.

Results 
Day 1 (18 June)

Day 2 (19 June)

Day 3 (20 June)

Day 4 (21 June)

Day 5 (22 June)

References 

2013
2013 tennis exhibitions
2013 sports events in London
2013 in English tennis
June 2013 sports events in the United Kingdom